The 2012–13 Maryland Terrapins men's basketball team represented the University of Maryland, College Park in 2012–13 NCAA Division I men's basketball season as a member of the Atlantic Coast Conference (ACC). The team, led by second year head coach Mark Turgeon, played their home games at the Comcast Center. They finished the season 25–13, 8–10 in ACC play to finish in seventh place. They advanced to the semifinals of the ACC tournament where they lost to North Carolina. They were invited to the 2013 NIT where they defeated Niagara, Denver and Alabama to advance to the semifinals at Madison Square Garden where they lost to Iowa.

Preseason

Departures

Class of 2012 Signees

Roster

Depth chart

Schedule and results

|-
!colspan=12 style="background:#CE1126; color:#FFFFFF;"| Exhibition

|-
!colspan=12 style="background:#CE1126; color:#FFFFFF;"| Non-Conference Regular Season

|-
!colspan=12 style="background:#CE1126; color:#FFFFFF;"| ACC Regular Season

|-
!colspan=12 style="text-align: center; background:#CE1126"|2013 ACC tournament

|-
!colspan=12 style="text-align: center; background:#CE1126"|2013 NIT

Stats

References
2012–13 Maryland basketball site
umterps.com
ESPN

Maryland Terrapins men's basketball seasons
Maryland
Maryland
Terra
Terra